Eliza Doolittle is the debut album by British recording artist Eliza Doolittle. It was released by Parlophone Records on 12 July 2010 in the United Kingdom. The first single, "Skinny Genes", was released on 11 April 2010. The second single, "Pack Up", was released on 5 July 2010. The album was released in the United States on 19 April 2011.

Critical reception

Upon release, Eliza Doolittle received positive reviews from music critics. At Metacritic, which assigns a normalized rating out of 100 to reviews from mainstream critics, the album has an average score of 68 based on 6 reviews, indicating "generally favorable reviews." Michael Hann, writing for The Guardian, called Eliza Doolittle  "a coherent and effortless-sounding debut album [...] It's a delicious soufflé [...] that feels as light as air, melting on your tongue. Admittedly, that also means that as soon as it is over it has disappeared without a trace, but do picnic soundtracks really need to be weighed down with pretensions to significance?" Steve Horowitz from PopMatters fount that the album "mostly succeeds. The baker’s dozen worth of tracks here are delightfully sweet, if maybe a bit light in content. This is ear candy that’s meant to be pleasing rather than personal, and avoids political or controversial topics."

Allmusic editor by Jon O'Brien found that the "formula of brush-stroke percussion, bluesy guitars, and light airy melodies is repeated throughout the entire 13 tracks, but Doolittle's timeless and effortlessly dreamy tones make the slight repetitiveness a lot easier to endure [...] While its relentless chirpiness may be a little too twee for some, Eliza Doolittle is still a beguiling debut that would undoubtedly have found an audience even without the benefit of her showbiz background." Simon Cage from Daily Express remarked that the "songs are quirky and strong, her voice gorgeous and the whole thing is busting out all over with charm. Nice work young lady." Fraser McAlpine of BBC wrote that "if you can handle a lot of wacky in your pop music, there’s a lovely album here waiting for you."

Chart performance
Eliza Doolitte peaked at number three on the UK Albums Chart. On 7 January 2011, it was announced by the British Phonographic Industry (BPI) that the album had been certified Platinum for sales of 300,000 in the UK.

Track listing

Notes
 "Missing" features a sample from the 1959 The Fleetwoods hit "Come Softly to Me"
 "Pack Up" features uncredited vocals from Lloyd Wade and contains elements of "Pack Up Your Troubles in Your Old Kit-Bag"

Personnel

Eliza Doolittle – lead vocals, composer, original concept
George Asaf – composer
Avigail – stylist
John Beck – composer, keyboards
Andy Bradfield – mixing
Ian Brudge – cello
Steve Chrisanthou – bass, composer, engineer, guitar, mixing, producer, programming
Lauren Christy – composer
Pete Davis – programming
Craigie Dodds – bass, composer, drums, guitar, keyboards, mixing, piano, producer, programming, ukulele, backing vocals, whistle
Grippa – mixing
Mads Hauge – bass, composer, engineer, hand clapping, mandolin, maracas, melodica, producer, whistle
Simon Helm – art direction, design
Dean James – engineer, percussion
Will Johnstone – composer, engineer, mellotron
Jonny $. – bass, composer, guitar, mixing, percussion, producer
Greg Kurstin – composer, engineer, guitar, keyboards, mixing, producer, programming
Arnulf Lindner – double bass
Tom Meadows – drums
Jimmy Napes – mixing, producer
James Napier – bass, composer, drums, guitar
Jake Newman – double bass
Felix Powell – composer
Matt Prime – composer, guitar, keyboards, mixing, producer, programming, backing vocals
Dan Sanders – art direction
Ash Soan – drums
The PSM – drums, percussion
Liz Taw – hair stylist
Phil Thornalley – composer, glockenspiel, guitar, handclapping, piano, producer
Lloyd Wade – vocals
Andy Whitton – photography
Paul Williams – guitar
Tim Woodcock – composer, backing vocals
Christian Wright – mastering

Charts

Weekly charts

Year-end charts

Certifications

Release history

References 

2010 debut albums
Albums produced by Greg Kurstin
Eliza Doolittle (singer) albums
Parlophone albums
Albums produced by Jimmy Napes